Stiroma is a genus of true bugs belonging to the family Delphacidae.

The species of this genus are found in Europe.

Species:
 Stiroma affinis  Fieber, 1866 
 Stiroma bicarinata  (Herrich-Schäffer, 1835)

References

Delphacidae